Schuddebeurs is a hamlet in the Dutch province of Zeeland. It is a part of the municipality of Schouwen-Duiveland, and lies about 3 km north of Zierikzee.

During the 17th and 18th century, the affluent merchants from Zierikzee started to built estates in Schuddebeurs as summer residences. Schuddebeurs was home to 55 people in 1840.

Gallery

References

Schouwen-Duiveland
Populated places in Zeeland